Gantamulla is a village in Baramulla district in Jammu and Kashmir India. Gantamulla village is divided into two areas Gantamulla Payeen and Gantamulla Bala.

References 

Villages in Baramulla district